Elisabeth Kulman (born 28 June 1973) is an Austrian classical singer who has performed operatic roles in soprano, mezzo-soprano and contralto repertory. She has appeared at opera houses in Vienna and internationally. She has performed early operas such as Legrenzi's Il Giustino as well as new works, creating the role of Gora in the premiere of Reimann's Medea at the Vienna State Opera. She recorded Lieder by Mussorgsky, Bach's Christmas Oratorio with Peter Schreier and Beethoven's Missa solemnis with Nikolaus Harnoncourt. From 2015, she has focused on concert singing.

Career 
Born in Oberpullendorf, Kulman achieved the Matura in 1991. She studied Russian,  and musicology. She began voice studies in 1995 at the Universität für Musik und darstellende Kunst Wien with Helena Lazarska. She completed her studies in both Oper and Lied und Oratorium as a master of arts mit Auszeichnung. She was immediately engaged to appear as Pamina in Mozart's Die Zauberflöte at the Wiener Volksoper in 2001, followed by other Mozart roles such as the Countess in Le nozze di Figaro and Donna Elvira in Don Giovanni.

In 2004, Kulman changed to mezzo-soprano, with the title role of Suppé's Boccaccio, staged by Helmuth Lohner. She appeared as Orpheus in Gluck's Orphée et Eurydice at the Opéra National de Paris in June 2005. She sang the title role of Bizet's Carmen at the Staatsoper Berlin in 2007. In 2010, she appeared as Gora in the premiere of Aribert Reimann's Medea at the Vienna State Opera. In 2011 she appeared in Berlin again as Smeton in Donizetti's Anna Bolena, alongside Anna Netrebko in the title role and Elīna Garanča as Giovanna Seymour.

In the field of historically informed performance, she appeared in two opera revivals at the Schwetzingen Festival, both conducted by Thomas Hengelbrock, in 2005 in Alessandro Scarlatti's Telemaco, and in 2007 in the title role of Giovanni Legrenzi's Il Giustino.

She recorded Bach's Christmas Oratorio on DVD, conducted by Peter Schreier who also performed the part of the Evangelist, with the Münchener Bach-Chor, the Bach Collegium München, Sibylla Rubens, Martin Petzold and Andreas Scheibner. In 2013, she recorded Beethoven's Missa solemnis, conducted by Nikolaus Harnoncourt, with the Netherlands Radio Choir, the Royal Concertgebouw Orchestra and alongside Marlis Petersen, Werner Güra and Gerald Finley.

From April 2015, she has focused on concerts.

Awards 
 2007: Eberhard-Waechter-Medaille
 2014: Helga de Oro as best mezzo-soprano

Roles

Mezzo-soprano and contralto (from 2004) 
 Flora Bervoix – Verdi: La Traviata – Volksoper 2004
 Boccaccio – Suppé: Boccaccio – Volksoper 2004, 2005 and 2006
 Erifile/Antiope – A. Scarlatti: Telemaco – Schwetzingen Festival 2005
 Orfeo – Gluck: Orfeo ed Euridice – Paris Opéra 2005, 2008; Salzburg Festival 2010 
 Prinz Orlofsky – J. Strauss: Die Fledermaus – Volksoper 2005 and 2007, Vienna State Opera 2006 to 2015 
 Carmen – Bizet: Carmen – Volksoper 2005 and 2007; Staatsoper Unter den Linden 2007
 Hänsel – Humperdinck: Hänsel und Gretel – Volksoper 2005 and 2006
 Dritte Dame – Mozart: Die Zauberflöte – Volksoper 2005, 2006 and 2007; Vienna State Opera 2006 to 2009 
 Suzuki – Puccini: Madama Butterfly – Volksoper 2006; Vienna State Opera 2007/08 
 Nancy – Flotow: Martha – Volksoper Wien 2006
 Hippolyta – Britten: A Midsummer Night's Dream – Volksoper 2006
 Magdalena – Kienzl: Der Evangelimann – Volksoper 2007
 Giustino – Legrenzi: Il Giustino – Schwetzingen Festival 2007 
 Fenena – Verdi: Nabucco –  2007; Vienna State Opera 2008/09; Bavarian State Opera 2011 
 Marina Mnischek – Mussorgsky: Boris Godunow – Vienna State Opera 2007 and 2009 
 Mrs. Quickly – Verdi: Falstaff – Vienna State Opera 2008 und 2009; Salzburg Festival 2013
 Polina – Tschaikowsky: Pique Dame – Vienna State Opera 2008 and 2009 
 Zweite Norn – Wagner: Götterdämmerung – Vienna State Opera 2008/09; Bukarest/Enescu Festival 2013
 Ulrica – Verdi: Un ballo in maschera – Vienna State Opera 2009 
 Brigitta – Korngold: Die tote Stadt – Vienna State Opera 2009 
 Floßhilde – Wagner: Das Rheingold – Vienna State Opera 2009 
 Grimgerde – Wagner: Die Walküre – Vienna State Opera 2009 
 Olga – Tschaikowsky: Eugen Onegin – Vienna State Opera 2009 
 Clairon – R. Strauss: Cappriccio – Vienna State Opera 2009
 Herodias – R. Strauss: Salome – Vienna State Opera 2009, 2015 
 Waltraute – Wagner: Götterdämmerung – Vienna State Opera 2009, 2013; Bamberg 2013; Lucerne 2013; Bukarest/Enescu Festival 2013
 Gora – Reimann: Medea (premiere) – Vienna State Opera 2010 
 Fricka – Wagner: Das Rheingold – Vienna State Opera 2010, 2014; Bavarian State Opera 2013, 2015 
 Fricka – Wagner: Die Walküre – Vienna State Opera 2010, 2014; Bavarian State Opera 2013, 2015; Lucerne 2013; Bukarest/Enescu Festival 2013; Valencia 2013
 Smeton – Donizetti: Anna Bolena – Vienna State Opera 2011 
 Ludmila – Smetana: Die verkaufte Braut – styriarte 2011 
 Gaea – R. Strauss: Daphne – Vienna State Opera 2011 
 Witwe Begbick – Weill: Aufstieg und Fall der Stadt Mahagonny – Vienna State Opera 2012 
 Boulotte – Offenbach: Barbe-bleue – styriarte 2013
 Brangäne – Wagner: Tristan und Isolde – Vienna State Opera 2013 
 Cherubino – Mozart: Le nozze di Figaro – Theater an der Wien 2014
 Despina – Mozart: Così fan tutte – Theater an der Wien 2014
 Erda – Wagner: Das Rheingold – Opera Nomori Festival Tokio 2014

Soprano (1998–2004) 
 Susanna – Mozart: Le nozze di Figaro – Universität für Musik und darstellende Kunst Wien 1998 and 1999
 Frau Fluth – Nicolai: Die lustigen Weiber von Windsor – Universität für Musik und darstellende Kunst Wien 2000
 Contessa Almaviva – Mozart: Le nozze di Figaro – 4. Grazer Gartenfestival 2000; Universität für Musik und darstellende Kunst Wien 2001; Volksoper Wien 2003 and 2004
 Mme Euterpova – Menotti: Help! Help! The Globolinks! – Universität für Musik und darstellende Kunst Wien 2001
 Rosalinde – Strauss: Die Fledermaus – Akademie für Musik Krakau 2001
 Alcina – Handel: Alcina – Junge Oper St. Pölten 2001
 Pamina – Mozart: Die Zauberflöte – Volksoper Wien 2001, 2002 and 2003; Stadttheater St. Gallen 2012
 Fraarte – Handel: Radamisto – Salzburger Pfingstfestspiele 2002
 Don Pedro – Massenet: Don Quichotte – Wiener Klangbogen 2002
 Vera – Mascagni: Si – Volksoper Wien 2002
 Olga – Vives: La Generala – Volksoper Wien 2002 and 2003
 Donna Elvira – Mozart: Don Giovanni – Volksoper Wien 2002 and 2004

Discography 

CD:
 Franz Liszt: Via crucis S 53, Wiener Kammerchor,  – Label: Carus
 Gustav Mahler: Lieder, with Ensemble Amarcord Wien – Label: material records, 2009 
 Modest Mussorgsky: Lieder (Mussorgsky Dis-Covered), with Tscho Theissing, Arkady Shilkloper, Miki Skuta and Georg Breinschmid – Label: Preiser Records, 2010 
 Mussorgsky: Lieder (Kinderstube), with Kirill Gerstein (Klavier) – Label: Preiser Records, 2012
 Hans Sommer: Orchesterlieder; with Bo Skovhus (baritone), Bamberger Symphoniker, conductor: Sebastian Weigle – Label: Tudor, 2012
 frauen.leben.liebe – Robert Schumann, Richard Wagner – with Eduard Kutrowatz (Klavier) – Label: Preiser Records, 2014
 Wer wagt mich zu höhnen? – Ein Ständchen für Richard Wagner und Giuseppe Verdi – with Amarcord Wien – Label: ORF, 2014

DVD:
 Bach: Christmas Oratorio BWV 248, Münchener Bach-Chor, Bach-Collegium München, Peter Schreier – Label: Obligat, 2005 (2 DVD) 
 Beethoven: Missa solemnis, Royal Concertgebouw Orchestra, Nikolaus Harnoncourt – Label: Unitel Classica, 2013 
 Donizetti: Anna Bolena (role: Smeton), Wiener Staatsoper, Evelino Pidò – Label: Deutsche Grammophon, 2011 (2 DVD)
 Aribert Reimann: Medea (role: Gora), Wiener Staatsoper, Michael Boder – Label: Arthaus, 2010 (DVD)
 Smetana: Die verkaufte Braut (Rolle: Ludmila), styriarte, Nikolaus Harnoncourt – Label: Styriarte Festival Edition, 2012 (DVD)
 Verdi: Nabucco (role: Fenena), Opernfestspiele St. Margarethen, Robert Herzl – Label: Euroarts, 2007 (DVD)
 Verdi: Falstaff (role: Mrs. Quickly), Salzburg Festival, Zubin Mehta – Label: Unitel Classica, 2013 (DVD)

References

External links 
 
 Elisabeth Kulman Operabase
 Elisabeth Kulman (Mezzo-soprano, Contralto) Bach Cantatas Website
 Elisabeth Kulman Münchner Philharmoniker
 Interview, 01/2008: Elisabeth Kulman, Der Beruf hat mich gewählt (interview, in German) Der neue Merker, January 2008
 "Salzburg zahlt wieder" (interview, (in German) crescendo.de
 Mussorgsky Dis-Covered
 Photos projects.kinderfotografie.at
 Ein köstliches Pasticcio (in German) Kleine Zeitung, 7 July 2016

Austrian operatic sopranos
Austrian operatic mezzo-sopranos
Musicians from Vienna
People from Oberpullendorf District
University of Music and Performing Arts Vienna alumni
1973 births
Living people
21st-century Austrian women  opera singers